The 1993 San Marino Open was a women's tennis tournament played on outdoor clay courts at the Centro Tennis Cassa de Risparmio in the City of San Marino, San Marino that was part of the Tier IV category of the 1993 WTA Tour. It was the third and last edition of the WTA San Marino and was held from 26 July until 1 August 1993. Unseeded Marzia Grossi won the singles title and earned $18,000 first-prize money.

Finals

Singles

 Marzia Grossi defeated  Barbara Rittner 3–6, 7–5, 6–1
 It was Grossi's first singles title of her career.

Doubles

 Sandra Cecchini /  Patricia Tarabini defeated  Florencia Labat /  Barbara Rittner 6–3, 6–2

See also
 1993 Campionati Internazionali di San Marino – men's tournament

References

External links
 ITF tournament edition details
 Tournament draws

WTA San Marino
WTA San Marino
1993 in San Marino
San Marino
San Marino